Ranunculidae is a subclass of plants used in some taxonomic systems and not others. By necessity it includes the order Ranunculales, but otherwise it differs between taxonomic systems.

References

Plant subclasses